Bolmer is a surname. Notable people with the surname include:

Brandon Bolmer, American vocalist 
Gert Bolmer (born 1983), Dutch dressage rider